Think of Tomorrow is the tenth album by Pentangle. It was released on Ariola/Hypertension 883 697/HYCD 200 112 in 1991. Green Linnet released it in the same year on GLCD-3057. Hypertension re-released it in 2005. The notable change in personnel was Peter Kirtley who replaced Rod Clements.

Track listing
"O'er the Lonely Mountain" (Pentangle)
"Baby Now It's Over" (Pentangle)
"Share a Dream" (Pentangle)
"The Storyteller [Paddy's Song]" (Pentangle)
"Meat on the Bone" (Pentangle)
"Ever Yes, Ever No" (Pentangle)
"Straight Ahead" (Pentangle)
"The Toss of Golden Hair" (Trad)
"The Lark in the Clear Air" (Trad)
"The Bonny Boy" (Trad)
"Colour My Paintbook" (Pentangle)

Personnel
Jacqui McShee - vocals, handclapping
Bert Jansch - vocals, acoustic guitar, electric piano
Peter Kirtley - vocals, electric and acoustic guitar, mandolin
Gerry Conway - drums, percussion, conga
Nigel Portman Smith - bass, piano, keyboards
Frank Wulff (guest) - flute, whistle

References

1991 albums
Pentangle (band) albums